Maryna Godwin (later Maryna Proctor, born 9 September 1944) is a retired South African tennis player. Her best achievement was reaching quarterfinals of the 1968 US Open.

In 1968 and 1969 she played in four ties for the South African Fed Cup team.

In 1969 she met South African cricketer Mike Procter. They married three months later, after which Godwin changed her last name and retired from competitions. For many years, due to Procter's cricket contracts, their family was living half-year in England and half-year in Zimbabwe, but since 1980s they settled in Durban North, South Africa.

Career finals

Doubles (1 runner-up)

References

External links
 
 
 
 Maryna Procter (Godwin). wimbledon.com

1944 births
Living people
People from Mthatha
White South African people
South African female tennis players
Sportspeople from the Eastern Cape